Teagan Quitoriano (born March 15, 2000) is an American football tight end for the Houston Texans of the National Football League (NFL). He played college football at Oregon State.

College career
Quitoriano played at Oregon State from 2018 to 2021.

Collegiate statistics

Professional career
Quitoriano was drafted by the Houston Texans in the fifth round, 170th overall, of the 2022 NFL Draft. He was placed on injured reserve on September 1, 2022. While being activated hours before a Thursday Night game against the Philadelphia Eagles, he caught a two-yard touchdown pass for his first NFL reception. In Week 18, against the Indianapolis Colts, he had three receptions for 83 yards in the 32–31 victory. He finished his rookie season with seven receptions for 113 receiving yards and two receiving touchdowns in nine games, of which he started six.

References

External links

 Houston Texans bio
 Oregon State Beavers bio

2000 births
Living people
American sportspeople of Filipino descent
American football tight ends
Oregon State Beavers football players
Houston Texans players
People from Salem, Oregon